Claricia or Clarica was a 13th-century German illuminator. She is noted for including a self-portrait in a South German psalter of c. 1200, now in The Walters Art Museum, Baltimore. In the self-portrait, she depicts herself as swinging from the tail of a letter Q.  Additionally, she inscribed her name over her head.  

Feminist studies in the field of literature and medieval art such as Whitney Chadwick and Dorothy Miner uncovered Claricia's work in one of her manuscripts. "Claricia’s hand is just one of several in this manuscript, leading Dorothy Miner to conclude on the basis of her dress – uncovered head, braided hair, and a close-fitting tunic under a long-waisted dress with long tapering points hanging from the sleeves – that she was probably a lay student at the convent."

There is controversy regarding Claricia's occupation. Scholars such as Miner believe that Claricia was a lay woman - possibly a high-born lady - active in a convent scriptorium in Augsburg. Some, however, rejected that she was employed as a convent assistant, noting that the language of the psalm was derogatory.

References

External links
 Middle Ages Women Artists

See also
 List of German women artists

Manuscript illuminators
13th-century German artists
13th-century German women
Romanesque artists
German women painters
13th-century women artists